Dunsford is an English habitational surname. Notable people with the surname include:

Brian Dunsford (born 1936), Australian rules footballer
Cathie Dunsford (born 1953), New Zealand novelist
Colin Dunsford, Australian accountant
Cynthia Dunsford (born 1962), Canadian politician
James Dunsford (1814-1883), English-Canadian politician
John Dunsford (1855-1905), Australian politician
Martin Dunsford (1744-1807), English antiquarian